Tihomir Ruslanov Grozdanov (born 29 April 1987) is a former professional Bulgarian tennis player. On 30 December 2013, he reached his highest ATP singles ranking of 394 whilst his best doubles ranking was 545 on 17 January 2011.

Year-end rankings

Challenger and Futures Finals

Singles: 10 (4–6)

Doubles: 18 (10–8)

Davis Cup 
Tihomir Grozdanov debuted for the Bulgaria Davis Cup team in 2008. Since then he has 11 nominations with 13 ties played, his singles W/L record is 4–2 and doubles W/L record is 9–1 (13–3 overall).

Singles (4–2)

Doubles (7–1) 

 RR = Round Robin
 RPO = Relegation Play–off
 PPO = Promotion Play–off

References

External links

 
 
 

Bulgarian male tennis players
Sportspeople from Varna, Bulgaria
1987 births
Living people
21st-century Bulgarian people